John Botica (born 24 May 1953) is a New Zealand pebble mosaic artist and a designer. He is based in Beachlands, Auckland, New Zealand.

Life
Botica was born in Belgrade, Serbia in 1953 and most of his life he was involved in tennis, being a tennis professional. He has lived in United States and Germany and has settled in New Zealand since 1997.  In 2004 he was able to discover his true passion,  namely pebble mosaic art establishing an innovative approach  through bold usage of Maori and Polynesian motifs so common to his adopted country of New Zealand.  "John Botica became interested in pebble mosaics when his uncle gave him a book on the subject. John was already an accomplished mosaicist, using bright ceramic tiles, and he was instantly intrigued by the textures and patterns that could be created using only natural pebbles".  Botica has been involved in many private, and public commissions,  he has created what is described in the specialist publication Mosaic Art Now, one of the world's top 100 contemporary mosaic works. Botica's ‘Tree of Life’ was commissioned by the North Shore City Council and installed at a children's playground in Greenhithe, with the latest public project at Bastion Point, in Auckland, which is arguably one of the most important sites in recent New Zealand history.

In 2013 the St. Frajou Painting Museum, Haute Garonne, France, presented the preparatory drawings for the mosaics by Botica. In 2013, he also participated in National Mosaik Art Exhibition : Magic of Mosaic: Mosaic Symposium 2013 in the Helen Smith Meeting Room, Pataka + Museum, Auckland. Botica is member of Mosaic Association of Australia and New Zealand and founding member of Art Resilience movement created by Ksenia Milicevic in 2014 in Paris, France.

Public projects

Uxbridge Arts Centre 2005, Auckland
Waitakere City Council New Zealand 2007, Auckland
Wainoni Park, Auckland 2007,
Western Park, Auckland 2008,
Papakura Children's Playground 2008,Auckland
Wilson School 2009, Auckland
Global Cafe 2009, Auckland
Botanic Gardens, Auckland 2010,
Mangere Arts Centre 2010, Auckland
Children's Garden at Parana Park, Hamilton 2012,
Homai College 2014, Auckland
Bastion Point Entry 2016, Auckland
Carlton gardens, 2018, Melbourne, Australia

John Botica has created mosaics for some notable New Zealanders including Peter Jackson, Anita Finnigan and Bruce Aitken.

References

External links
Official site John Botica
Site Art Resilience

1953 births
Mosaic artists
21st-century New Zealand male artists
Living people
Serbian emigrants to New Zealand